Styrene maleic anhydride (SMA or SMAnh) is a synthetic polymer that is built-up of styrene and maleic anhydride monomers. The monomers can be almost perfectly alternating, making it an alternating copolymer, but (random) copolymerisation with less than 50% maleic anhydride content is also possible.  The polymer is formed by a radical polymerization, using an organic peroxide as the initiator.  The main characteristics of SMA copolymer are its transparent appearance, high heat resistance, high dimensional stability, and the specific reactivity of the anhydride groups. The latter feature results in the solubility of SMA in alkaline (water-based) solutions and dispersion.

SMA is available in a broad range of molecular weights and maleic anhydride (MA) contents. In a typical combination of those two properties, SMA is available as a crystal clear granule that can be used in a wide variety of applications. SMA polymers with a high molecular weight are widely used in engineering plastic applications, normally in the impact modified and optional glass fibre filled variants. Alternatively, SMA is applied using its transparency in combination with other transparent materials like PMMA or the heat resistance to heat-boost other polymers materials like ABS or PVC. The solubility of SMA in alkaline solutions makes it suitable for various applications in the field of sizings (paper), binders, dispersants and coatings. The specific reactivity of SMA makes it a suitable agent for compatibilizing normally incompatible polymers (e.g. ABS/PA blends) or cross-linking.
The glass transition temperature of Styrene maleic anhydride is 130 - 160 °C.

SMA producers 
There are only a few commercial suppliers of SMA polymers. The three major producers are Solenis (Scripset), Polyscope Polymers (Xiran), Sartomer (SMA). Nova Chemicals (Dylark) is no longer produced. While the Sartomer product range covers low molecular weight products with high MA contents (and sometimes chemically modified), the Nova materials are high molecular products with low MA content (and mainly impact modified). Polyscope's Xiran product range covers the full spectrum of SMA polymers, including chemically modified types. Each of those products have their own specific features.

SMA and male contraception (RISUG) 
SMA can be combined with the solvent dimethylsulfoxide (DMSO) in an application known as reversible inhibition of sperm under guidance (RISUG). The process is under phase III clinical trials in India and is a non-surgical method of male sterilization that is inexpensive, highly effective, and reversible. It involves an injection of the solution into each of the patient's Vas deferens, which forms a layer around the vas walls partially (but not completely) blocking the flow of sperm cells.  As cells pass by the substance, they are rendered inactive. If approved for widespread application, it could provide an alternative to the current two major methods of male contraception: condoms or vasectomies.

References

References list for RISUG

Copolymers